The Faisalabad–Chiniot Road (Punjabi), also known locally as Chiniot Road is a provincially maintained road in Punjab that extends from Faisalabad to Chiniot.

Expansion
The Punjab Highway Department has proposed to expand the road to 4 lanes.

Features
Length = 23 km
Lanes = 4 lanes (Katchery Chowk to M4 Motorway), 2 Lanes (M4 Motorway to Chiniot)
Speed limit = Universal minimum speed limit of 40 km/h and a maximum speed limit of 60 km/h for heavy transport vehicles and 80 km/h for light transport vehicles

References

Roads in Punjab, Pakistan
Transport in Faisalabad District